Maggie is a feminine given name or nickname.

Maggie may also refer to:

Film and television 
 Maggie (British TV series), a 1981–1982 British television series based on the novels by Joan Lingard
 Maggie (1981 American TV series), 1981–1982 American sitcom based on the books of Erma Bombeck
 Maggie (1998 TV series), 1998–1999 American TV series starring Ann Cusack
 The Maggie, 1954 British comedy film, released in America as High and Dry
 Maggie (film), a 2015 American drama/horror 
 Maggie (2022 TV series), an American sitcom on Hulu

Written works
 Maggie, 1919 stage musical by H. F. Maltby and Fred Thompson, adapted from the French  
 Maggie (musical), 1977 stage musical by Michael Wild
 "Maggie", 1983 Foster and Allen version of "When You and I Were Young, Maggie"
 Maggie: A Girl of the Streets, novel by American author Stephen Crane

Places in the United States
 Maggie, Virginia, an unincorporated community
 Maggie, West Virginia, an unincorporated community
 Maggie Creek (South Fork Flathead River tributary), Montana
 Maggie Creek (Humboldt River tributary), Nevada

Other uses 
 Tropical Storm Maggie, various Pacific Ocean storms
 MAGGIE ("Mars Automated Giant Gizmo for Integrated Engineering"), engineering model of the NASA-JPL 2020 Mars rover "Curiosity"
 Maggie, nickname for the aircraft carrier 
 Maggie, nickname for the Lady Margaret Boat Club, St. John's College, Cambridge, UK, rowing club
 Maggie, Australian magpie in Australian English
 Maggie's, Scottish charity which runs Maggie's Centres
 Maggie the Monkey (born 1991), a macaque at the Bowmanville Zoo
 Maggie (astronomy), cloud of hydrogen gas located in our (Milky Way) galaxy
 Maggie (library), "Multiprocess ActionScript Generic Game Interface Engine", for creating FLASH games

See also 

 Maggie, Maggie, Maggie! (chant), a British strike chant
 Maggi (disambiguation)